The Polish 50 Złotych note is a denomination of Polish currency.

External links

NBP

Currencies introduced in 1995
Banknotes of Poland
Fifty-base-unit banknotes